DumDum Boys are a Norwegian rock band from Trondheim. They are one of the most successful Norwegian rock acts of all time, and are considered one of the "four great" bands who popularized modern rock with Norwegian lyrics in the mid-to-late 1980s (along with Jokke & Valentinerne, Raga Rockers and DeLillos). Before breaking into the mainstream they were known as a punk rock act under the name Wannskrækk.

History

Wannskrækk (1979–1985) 
DumDum Boys started in the late 1970s as a punk rock act under the name Wannskrækk, inspired by acts such as Lasse Myrvold and The Aller Værste!, who pioneered punk rock with Norwegian lyrics. They played gigs extensively in Trondheim and gained a cult following. They released two singles, Faen Kuler Treffer Aldri Riktig (1981) and  " ...12"... " (1982), and one live album, Wannskrækk/Liliedugg - Last Opera/Live Ritz Trondheim 12. juni 84 . In 1992 a compilation album was released, "Wannskrækk - Riff (1980-1985)" which consisted of released and unreleased material from that period.

DumDum Boys (1985) 
In 1985 Wannskrækk adopted a more mainstream, rock sound and took the name DumDum Boys (after a song by Iggy Pop and David Bowie). The following year, they released their first single "Sorgenfri".

Blodig Alvor (1988) 
Their first album, Blodig Alvor (1988) broke into the sales charts at #14. The album received the Spellemannprisen for best rock record of the year.

Splitter Pine and Pstereo (1989–1990) 
Their second album Splitter Pine, was released in 1989, which also received a Spellemann award, and was certified gold. The third album Pstereo, released in 1990, also received the award.

1990–2018 
From 1990 to 2012 DumDum Boys has released eight albums, of which six reached #1, one #2, and one #7 on the Norwegian charts.

In 2011 they played a special concert as Wannskrækk at the music festival Øyafestivalen in Oslo. 

Their latest release, the 2018 album "Armer og Bein" went straight to #1.

Discography

Albums

Live albums

Compilation albums

EPs
1986: Bapshuari (EP)

DVDs
2004: DumDum Boys i Dødens Dal (live, DVD)

Notes

References

Norwegian rock music groups
Spellemannprisen winners
Musical groups established in 1985
1985 establishments in Norway
Musical groups from Trondheim